Raymondville Independent School District is a public school district based in Raymondville, Texas, United States.

In addition to Raymondville, the district serves the unincorporated areas of Ranchette Estates and Los Angeles Subdivision.

Students from grades 9 to 12 who are zoned to Lasara Independent School District, including the unincorporated area of Lasara, have the option of attending either Raymondville High School, in Raymondville ISD, or Lyford High School, in the Lyford Consolidated Independent School District.

In 2009, the school district was rated "academically acceptable" by the Texas Education Agency.

Schools
Raymondville High School (Grades 9-12)
Myra Green Middle School (Grades 6-8)
Pittman Elementary School (Grades PK-5)
L. C. Smith Elementary School (Grades PK-5)
Options Academy
The school's mascot is the Bearkat and their colors are royal blue and gold.

See also 
 Castañeda v. Pickard

References

External links
 

School districts in Willacy County, Texas